The 2002–03 Football League Cup (known as the Worthington Cup for sponsorship reasons) was the 43rd staging of the Football League Cup, a knockout competition for England's top 92 football clubs.

The competition began on 20 August 2002, and ended with the final on 2 March 2003. The holders were Blackburn Rovers, but they were eliminated in the semi-finals by Manchester United.

The tournament was won by Liverpool, who beat Manchester United 2–0 in the final, thanks to goals from Michael Owen and Steven Gerrard.

Preliminary round
A preliminary round was necessary to reduce the number of teams by one, because of the extra UEFA Cup place awarded to newly relegated Ipswich Town through the Fair Play league.

First round

Second round

Third round

Fourth round

Quarter-finals

Semi-finals

First leg

Second leg

Liverpool win 3-2 on aggregate.

Manchester United win 4–2 on aggregate

Final

The 2003 Football League Cup Final was played on 2 March 2003 at the Millennium Stadium in Cardiff. The game was contested between Manchester United and Liverpool. Liverpool won the game 2–0.

See also
EFL Cup
2002–03 in English football

References

External links
Official Carling Cup website
Carling Cup at bbc.co.uk
League Cup news, match reports and pictures on Reuters.co.uk

EFL Cup seasons
Cup